Zombie Lover is the twenty-second book of the Xanth series by Piers Anthony.

Plot summary
Breanna, a beautiful young newcomer to the enchanted land of Xanth, must deal with a distressing dilemma. She has unwittingly attracted the affections of King Xeth, ruler of Xanth's Zombies, who yearns to make her Queen of the Undead.

References

 22
1998 American novels
1998 fantasy novels
Tor Books books